The 2007 Liberty Bowl was a college football postseason bowl game played on December 29, 2007, at Liberty Bowl Memorial Stadium in Memphis, Tennessee. The 49th edition of the Liberty Bowl matched the University of Central Florida (UCF) Knights, winners of the Conference USA Championship for the first time in school history, and the Mississippi State University (MSU) Bulldogs, in their first bowl game under head coach Sylvester Croom. With sponsorship from AutoZone, the game was officially the AutoZone Liberty Bowl. Mississippi State free safety Derek Pegues intercepted two passes as part of an outstanding overall defensive effort by the Bulldogs on his way to earning MVP honors. The Bulldogs emerged victorious by a score of 10–3.

References

Liberty Bowl
Liberty Bowl
Mississippi State Bulldogs football bowl games
UCF Knights football bowl games